Pibb Xtra is a reformulation of Mr. Pibb (sometimes styled as Mr. PiBB), a soft drink created and marketed by The Coca-Cola Company. It has several variants. As of 2020, it is sold in bottles, cans, and two-liter bottles, and is available in most Coca-Cola Freestyle machines. It has a subtle cherry undertone.

History
 First introduced as "Peppo" to compete against Dr Pepper, the name was changed to "Mr. Pibb" after Dr Pepper sued The Coca-Cola Company for trademark infringement. The original test markets for Mr. Pibb in 1972 were located in Waco, Texas, the birthplace of Dr Pepper, before the company moved to Dallas, Texas. In 1980, Mr. Pibb was reformulated and marketed with the words "New Taste" printed prominently on the products.

In 2001, a cinnamon-forward "spicy cherry" flavor replaced the original formula in many parts of the United States, marketed as a bolder version of original Mr. Pibb. As recently as 2020, Pibb Xtra has been marketed as a "refreshing, spicy cherry alternative to regular cola".

Variations
Pibb Xtra Introduced in 2001, replacing Mr. PiBB

Pibb Zero Replaced Diet Mr. PiBB.

Coca-Cola Freestyle flavors
Pibb is now available in some Freestyle machines at restaurant chains that do not serve Dr Pepper or regions where Dr Pepper is not bottled by a local Coca-Cola distributor, which introduced the brand to new countries exclusively through the machines.  In 2011, Pibb Xtra expanded to two new flavors: Pibb Xtra Cherry and Pibb Xtra Cherry-Vanilla. Released for Coca-Cola Freestyle machines, both new flavors were also released for Pibb Zero. Pibb Xtra Strawberry was released in 2018, along with Dr Pepper and Coca-Cola Strawberry.

Ingredients
Carbonated water, high fructose corn syrup, caramel color, phosphoric acid, potassium sorbate and potassium benzoate, artificial and natural flavors, caffeine, monosodium phosphate, lactic acid, polyethylene glycol.

References

External links 
 

Carbonated drinks
Coca-Cola brands
Dr Pepper-flavored sodas
Products introduced in 1972